Chung Fu is an MTR Light Rail stop. It is located above the roundabout of Tin Shui Road and Tin Wah Road, next to T Town, in Tin Shui Wai, Yuen Long District. It is the only elevated Light Rail stop in Tin Shui Wai, and the distance between it and Tin Fu stop is the shortest in the current Light Rail system. It began service on 7 December 2003 and belongs to Zone 5A.

References

MTR Light Rail stops
Former Kowloon–Canton Railway stations
Tin Shui Wai
Railway stations in Hong Kong opened in 2003
MTR Light Rail stops named from housing estates